The Shire of Carnarvon is a local government area in the Gascoyne region of Western Australia, located about  north of the state capital, Perth. The major industries in the area are wool, agriculture (especially bananas and tomatoes) and, more recently, tourism.

History

The Shire of Carnarvon was established on 12 February 1965 with the amalgamation of the Town of Carnarvon and the surrounding Shire of Gascoyne-Minilya.

Bernier Island, Dorre Island and Koks Island were included in the shire on 3 December 1982.

Wards
The Shire is divided into 4 wards, most of which have one councillor. The Shire President is directly elected.

 Town Ward (6 councillors)
 Plantation Ward
 Gascoyne/Minilya North
 Gascoyne/Minilya South

Towns, suburbs and localities
The towns, suburbs and localities of the Shire of Carnarvon with population and size figures based on the most recent Australian census:

Notable councillors
 Dudley Maslen, Shire of Carnarvon councillor 1975–1988; later a state MP

Heritage-listed places

As of 2023, 111 places are heritage-listed in the Shire of Carnarvon, of which 13 are on the State Register of Heritage Places.

References

External links
 

 
Carnarvon